John Malcolm (1723-1788, sometimes spelled Malcom or Malcomb) was a British sea captain, army officer, and customs official who was the victim of the most publicized tarring and feathering during the American Revolution.

Malcolm was from Boston and a staunch supporter of royal authority. During the War of the Regulation, he traveled to the Province of North Carolina to help put down the uprising. Working for the customs services, he pursued his duties with a zeal that made him very unpopular, especially since he was a Loyalist during the Tea Act, the threepence tea tax detested by the Patriots.

In November 1773, sailors in Portsmouth, New Hampshire, tarred and feathered him. Malcolm got off relatively easily in the attack since the tar and feathers were applied while he was still fully clothed.

As a strong Loyalist, Malcolm often faced abuse and provocation from Boston's Patriots, the critics of British authority. People often "hooted" at him in the streets, but Governor Thomas Hutchinson urged him not to respond.

A confrontation with the Patriot shoemaker George Hewes thrust Malcolm into the spotlight. On January 25, 1774, according to the account in the Massachusetts Gazette, Hewes saw Malcolm threatening to strike a boy with his cane. When Hewes intervened to stop Malcolm, both men began arguing, and Malcolm insisted that Hewes should not interfere in the business of a gentleman. When Hewes replied that at least he had never been tarred and feathered himself, Malcolm struck Hewes hard on the forehead with the cane and knocked him unconscious.

That night, a crowd seized Malcolm in his house and dragged him into King Street to punish him for the attack on Hewes and the boy. Some Patriot leaders, believing that mob violence hurt their cause, tried to dissuade the crowd by arguing that Malcolm should be turned over to the justice system. Hewes, who had recovered, also protested the attack on Malcolm.

The crowd refused to relent, however, and cited among other arguments Ebenezer Richardson, a customs official who had killed an 11-year-old Bostonian, Christopher Seider, but escaped punishment by receiving a royal pardon.

The crowd then stormed Malcolm's house and dragged him out into the cold winter night. Malcolm was then stripped to the waist and covered with tar and feathers before he was forced into a waiting cart. The crowd then took him to the Liberty Tree and told him to apologize for his behavior, renounce his customs commission, and curse King George III.

When Malcolm refused, the crowd put a rope around his neck and threatened to hang him. That did not break him, but when it threatened to cut off his ears, Malcolm relented. The crowd then forced Malcolm to consume copious amounts of tea and sarcastically toasted the King and the royal family. Malcolm was finally freed and was sent home but continued to endure physical beatings as he returned. The event was reported in newspapers on both sides of the Atlantic Ocean.

After those events, Malcolm moved to England, where he unsuccessfully ran for Parliament against John Wilkes, the controversial champion of colonial rights.

References
Notes

Frequently cited sources
Young, Alfred F. The Shoemaker and the Tea Party: Memory and the American Revolution. Boston: Beacon Press, 1999. ; .

Further reading
Hersey, Frank W.C. "Tar and Feathers: The Adventures of Captain John Malcom". Transactions of the Colonial Society of Massachusetts 34 (1941): 429–73.

18th-century births
1788 deaths
Customs officers
American Loyalists from Massachusetts
People from colonial Boston
Tarring and feathering in the United States